Bill Samko (born July 8, 1952) is an American college football coach. He is the assistant head coach and offensive line coach at the Bentley University. Samko served as head coach of Tufts University between 1994 and 2010, where he compiled a record of 57–79 He also served as head coach of Sewanee: The University of the South (Sewanee) between 1987 and 1993 where he compiled an overall record of 35–27–1. Prior to his career as a head coach, Samko served as an assistant coach at Tufts from 1974 to 1980 and at Yale from 1981 to 1986.

Head coaching record

Football

References

External links
 Bentley profile

1952 births
Living people
Bentley Falcons football coaches
Holy Cross Crusaders football coaches
Sewanee Tigers baseball coaches
Sewanee Tigers football coaches
Tufts Jumbos baseball coaches
Tufts Jumbos football coaches
UConn Huskies baseball players
UConn Huskies football players
Yale Bulldogs football coaches
Players of American football from Worcester, Massachusetts
Baseball players from Worcester, Massachusetts